Alphons Silbermann (August 11, 1909 – March 4, 2000) was a German Jewish sociologist, musicologist, entrepreneur and publicist.

Born in Cologne, he studied musicology, sociology and law at the Universities of Cologne, Freiburg i. Br. and Grenoble. After he gained his doctorate (Dr. jur.), the rise of Nazism led Silbermann to emigrate to the Netherlands and 1938 from Amsterdam via Paris, where he worked as a waiter, to Sydney. In Australia he started as a dishwasher but went soon from rags to riches with his own fast food restaurant Silver's Food Bars. He initiated the first fastfood chain of Australia, becoming a successful entrepreneur.

His academic career started in 1944 in Sydney at the New South Wales State Conservatorium of Music. As an empirical culture-sociologist, he went back to Europe (especially Paris) in 1951. In 1958 René König brought him back to Cologne, where he taught at the University. In 1964 he was called to the University of Lausanne as a successor of Vilfredo Pareto and later at the University of Bordeaux (1974–1979).

Alphons Silbermann was a member of the "Cologne School" (Kölner Schule) along with René König and others. He was one of the editors of the Kölner Zeitschrift für Soziologie und Sozialpsychologie (KZfSS) and founded the Institut für Massenkommunikation (Institute of Mass Communication). He was an important German pioneer of empirical methods, as against the ideological biases of many contemporary colleagues like his favorite opponent Theodor W. Adorno.

Bibliography
 1949: ...Of musical things. Sydney
 1963: The Sociology of Music. London. 
 1969: Morale chez Vilfredo Pareto. In: Cahiers Vilfredo Pareto, 18; Lausanne.
 1973: Soziologie der Massenkommunikation. Stuttgart.
 1981: Communication de Masse. Eléments de Sociologie empirique; Paris.
 1986: Comics and Visual Culture : Research Studies from Ten Countries. Editor with: H.D. Dryoff. Munich. 
 1989: Verwandlungen. Eine Autobiographie. (Autobiography). Berlin.
 2000: Grovelling and Other Vices: The Sociology of Sycophancy. (Folklore). Translated by Ladislaus Lob. London.

References

External links
 Alphons Silbermann in the German National Library catalogue
Portrait netzturbulenzen

German music critics
German sociologists
German emigrants to Australia
Jewish sociologists
Academic staff of the University of Cologne
Commanders Crosses of the Order of Merit of the Federal Republic of Germany
2000 deaths
1909 births
German male non-fiction writers
Sociomusicologists
20th-century German musicologists
Jewish emigrants from Nazi Germany to the Netherlands